Go Bo-gyeol  (born May 2, 1988) is a South Korean actress and model. She made her acting debut in 2011 film Turtles.

Career
Go Bo-gyeol made her debut as an actress in 2011 movie Turtles. Her TV series debut was Angel’s Revenge (2014). She has since appeared in a number of films and popular television dramas, including Guardian: The Lonely and Great God, Queen for Seven Days, Confession Couple, Hi Bye, Mama! and Mother.

Filmography

Film

Television series

Awards and nominations

References

External links
  at History D&C 
 
 
 

1988 births
Living people
South Korean television actresses
South Korean film actresses
21st-century South Korean actresses
Seoul Institute of the Arts alumni